The Honda RS250R was a race motorcycle manufactured by Honda to race in the 250cc class of the Grand Prix motorcycle World Championship. It was conceived as a production racer for customer teams and privateer riders, while factory-supported teams raced the works bikes RS250RW and NSR250. 

The RS250R debuted in 1984 as a development prototype, racing in the domestic All Japan Road Race Championship and entering some rounds in the World Championship. It was put on sale for customer teams for the  season onwards.

The Honda RS250R featured a V-twin 250 cc two-stroke engine with a V-angle of 90 degrees. A new 75 degrees V-twin was introduced in 1993.

Between 1984 and 2009 the RS250R has been produced in four different generations, named: ND5 (1984), NF5 (1987), NX5 (1993) and NXA (2001).

The bike should not be confused with the RS250RW, which was the name adopted for factory bikes in 1985 and from 2003 to 2009. Between 1986 and 2002 the factory bikes were named NSR250.

See also 
Honda NSR250
KTM 250 FRR
Suzuki RGV250
Kawasaki KR250
Gilera GFR 250
Yamaha YZR 250

External links 
 1997 model specifications
 History of the RS250R (Japanese)

RS250R
Grand Prix motorcycles
Two-stroke motorcycles